Oliver Scott Taylor (born 13 December 1993) is an English footballer who plays as a forward for Dorchester Town.

Career
Taylor started a two-year scholarship with Wycombe Wanderers in 2010. He finished his scholarship and signed his first professional contract in April 2012. He made his professional debut on 15 September 2012, in a 3–1 defeat away to Chesterfield in Football League Two, coming on as a substitute for Adam Thompson.

On 20 November 2012, Taylor joined semi-professional side, Hitchin Town on a two-month loan deal. Taylor was released by Wycombe Wanderers in May 2013  and was without a club until joining Woking in the Football Conference for the 2014–15 season. To date Taylor has failed to make an impact, with only one substitute appearance.

References

External links

1993 births
Living people
Footballers from Oxford
English footballers
Association football forwards
Wycombe Wanderers F.C. players
Hitchin Town F.C. players
Woking F.C. players
Frome Town F.C. players
Chippenham Town F.C. players
English Football League players
National League (English football) players
Southern Football League players